Edward Robeson Taylor (September 24, 1838 – July 5, 1923) was the 28th Mayor of San Francisco, serving from July 16, 1907, to January 7, 1910.

Early life
Edward Robeson Taylor was born on September 24, 1838, in Springfield, Illinois, the only son of Henry West Taylor and the former Mary Thaw of Philadelphia, Pennsylvania (he was descended on his mother's side from the early colonial merchant, Andrew Robeson, of Philadelphia). Taylor was a lawyer and a poet, who moved to California to escape the Civil War.  In 1898, he published a book of sonnets based on the paintings of William Keith.

Mayor of San Francisco
On July 16, 1907, Taylor was appointed mayor following the resignation of Charles Boxton, who served only eight days after the conviction and removal of Eugene Schmitz. At 68 years of age, he became the city's oldest mayor (a record he still holds as of 2021). Taylor was elected to a full two-year term that fall, defeating three other candidates (including future mayor P. H. McCarthy) with just over half the vote. He declined to run again in 1909, and would be the last member of the Democratic Party to lead San Francisco for over half a century (until John F. Shelley was elected in 1963).

Legacy

Edward Robeson Taylor died in San Francisco on July 5, 1923. His remains are housed at the San Francisco Columbarium.
The political economist Henry George credits Taylor for influencing his work on Progress and Poverty, one of the most popular and influential books in American history. In September, 1925 the name of San Francisco's Portola Elementary School was changed to Edward Robeson Taylor Elementary School to honor him.

Notes

References
Exhibition spotlights career...

External links

San Francisco Unified School District's page for E.R. Taylor Elementary School

1838 births
1923 deaths
Mayors of San Francisco
Politicians from Springfield, Illinois
California Democrats